En ettas dagbok is a 1985 TV series, based on the Viveca Sundvall book with the same name. Viveca Sundvall also wrote screenplay.

The main character is diary-writing first grader girl Mimmi, who was played by Camilla Wickbom. Other roles were played by Claudia Skolek, Pia Green, Kjell Bergqvist and Göthe Grefbo.

The series originally aired over Sveriges Television's TV1 between 19 October-23 November 1985 over SVT1. Reruns aired over the same channel between 27 April-1 June 1996. Music was composed by Sten Carlberg. Photographer was Andreas Turai.

References

External links
The TV series at SVT's open archive 

1985 Swedish television series debuts
1985 Swedish television series endings
Sveriges Television original programming
Swedish children's television series
Television shows based on children's books